Robert Kirk Tory was a Methodist minister in Nova Scotia.

Tory was born in Port Shoreham, Nova Scotia in 1838 to parents ♂Henry Tory (1793-1881) and Ann Dieckhoff (1792-1867), Tory married to Anorah Ferguson (1835-1931), they had three sons and started a political family spanning Nova Scotia and Ontario:

 James Cranswick Tory (1864–1944) Lieutenant Governor of Nova Scotia and Liberal MLA
 Henry Marshall Tory (1864–1947) a McGill University and Cambridge University grad, mathematics professor, founding president of the University of Alberta and the National Research Council of Canada
 John Alexander Tory Sr. (1869-1950) insurance company executive and father of John S. D. Tory, grandfather to John A. Tory and great-grandfather of John Tory (former Progressive Conservative Party of Ontario leader (2004-2009) and disgraced Toronto Mayor (2014-2023))

External links
 Tory Tory Tory

Canadian clergy
Canadian Methodist ministers
Canadian people of English descent
People from Guysborough County, Nova Scotia
1838 births
1892 deaths
Place of birth missing
Robert Kirk
19th-century Methodists